Vernice is a feminine name.

List of people with the name 

 Barbara Vernice Siggers Franklin, mother of Aretha Franklin
 Vernice Armour, first African-American female naval aviator in the Marine Corps
 Vernice Bellony, Dominican politician and teacher
 Vernice Simms, individual in the Tulsa riots

See also 

 Venice
 Bernice (given name)
 Denice (given name)

Feminine given names